Achina is a village in Highland, Scotland.

References

Populated places in Sutherland
Achina